J. V. Sekhar (7 January 1963 – 8 July 2003), better known as Master Sekhar, was an Indian child actor who predominantly appeared in Tamil and Malayalam films.

Early life and career 
Sekhar was born on 7 January 1963. He performed more than 50 films in four languages (Tamil, Telugu, Malayalam and Kannada). He was introduced to Tamil cinema as a child artist for the film Kudiyirundha Koyil in 1968. He performed in the lead roles in films including Manipayal and Oh Manju. He was famous for his child performance in many movies, and was called Master Sekhar. He played MGR's character as a child in films including Idhaya Veenai and Kudiyirundha Koyil. He also performed in TV serials. He is the son of cinematographer J.V. Vijayam.

He died on 8 July 2003 in Chennai after falling from the first floor of his house.

Partial filmography

References

External links 
 
 

Male actors in Tamil cinema
1963 births
2003 deaths